Sadkovsky is a rural locality (a khutor) in Mikhaylovskoye Rural Settlement, Uryupinsky District, Volgograd Oblast, Russia. The population was 244 as of 2010.

Geography 
Sadkovsky is located in forest steppe, 24 km northwest of Uryupinsk (the district's administrative centre) by road. Mikhaylovskaya is the nearest rural locality.

References 

Rural localities in Uryupinsky District